Poly(butyl acrylate) (PBA) is a family of organic polymers with the formulan. It is a synthetic acrylate polymer derived from butyl acrylate monomer. The polymers are colorless.  This homopolymer is far less important than copolymers derived from methyl acrylate and other monomers.  It has a low glass-transition temperature of about -43°C (20°C).

Copolymers
Far more important than PBA are copolymers produced from butyl acrylate and one or more of the following comonomers methyl methacrylate, styrene, acrylonitrile, vinyl acetate, vinyl chloride, vinylidene chloride, and butadiene.

References

Acrylate polymers